Babusar Pass or Babusar Top (Urdu: درہ بابوسر) (elevation ) is a mountain pass in Pakistan at the north of the 150 km (93 miles) long Kaghan Valley, connecting it via the Thak Nala with Chilas on the Karakoram Highway (KKH). It is the highest point in Kaghan Valley that can be easily accessed by cars.

The Babusar Pass connects Khyber Pakhtunkhwa with Gilgit-Baltistan. It is one of the most dangerous routes in Pakistan. Every year, many deaths happen here due to the mountainous slopes, which are among the most dangerous in the world. The most common reason for death is the brake failure of cars due to inexperience. Babusar Top was originally known as Babur Top, originating from the fact that the Mughal emperor Babur used to pass through this area in the early 16th century. Nowadays however, it is commonly referred to as Babusar Top.

Climate 
The Kaghan Valley is at its best during summer (from May to September). In May, the maximum temperature is 11 °C (52 °F) and the minimum temperature is 3 °C (37 °F). From the middle of July up to the end of September the road beyond Naran is open right up to the Babusar Pass. However, movement is restricted during the monsoon and winter seasons. The Kaghan area can be accessed by road via the cities of Islamabad or Peshawar.

Geography 
The mountain ranges which enter the Mansehra District from Kashmir are the offshoots of the great Himalayan system. In the Kaghan Valley, the mountain system is the highest of the area including the Babusar Top. This range flanks the right bank of the Kunhar River, and contains a peak called Malika Parbat, which is over 17,000 feet high, and is the highest in the valley.

On the mountains the grasslands are also found where Gujjars and other nomads migrate during the summer for grazing by their sheep, goats and other animals. On the north side, there are mountains which are the extension of the same mountain system as that of the Kaghan mountains. This range diverges from the eastern side at Musa ka Musalla, a peak at an elevation of around 13,500 feet, which skirts the north end of the Bhogarmang and Konsh valleys, and sends down a spur to divide the two. Here also, like Kaghan, thick forests are naturally present, especially on the higher slopes. However, due to extensive exploitation, the thick forests are now usually found in the unapproachable areas.

See also
 Khunjerab Pass
 Burzil Pass
 Khyber Pass
 Sazeen

References

Diamer District
Mountain passes of Gilgit-Baltistan
Mansehra District
Mountain passes of Khyber Pakhtunkhwa